KVAZ (91.5 FM) is a radio station licensed to Henryetta, Oklahoma, United States. The station is currently owned by South Central Oklahoma Christian Broadcasting, Inc. and broadcasts a Southern gospel format.

History
This station was assigned call sign KVAZ on February 27, 1985.

References

External links
thegospelstation.com

VAZ
Southern Gospel radio stations in the United States
Radio stations established in 1985
1985 establishments in Oklahoma